L3C may refer to:

 Low-profit limited liability company
 Level 3 Communications, a U.S. telco and ISP
 L-3 Communications, a U.S. satellite and aerospace company
 Aeronca L-3C, a WWII USAAC airplane

See also

 13C
 LC3 (disambiguation)
 LCCC (disambiguation)
 LLLC (disambiguation)
 I3C (disambiguation)

 LC (disambiguation)